Nandurbar district (Marathi pronunciation: [nən̪d̪uɾbaːɾ]) is an administrative district in the northwest corner  of Maharashtra state in India . On 1 July 1998 Dhule was bifurcated as two separate districts now known as Dhule and Nandurbar. Nandurbar is a tribal-dominated district , The district headquarters are located at Nandurbar city. The district occupies an area of 5955 km2 and has a population of 1,648,295 of which 16.71% were urban (as of 2011).

Nandurbar district is bounded to the south and south-east by Dhule district, to the west and north is the state of Gujarat, to the north and north-east is the state of Madhya Pradesh. The northern boundary of the district is defined by the great Narmada river.

Ranjana Sonawane of Tembhli village and rushil in Nandurbar district became first citizen of India to get twelve (12) digit Unique Identification on 29 September 2010. The unique identification or Aadhaar is ambitious project of the central government of India to provide unique identification to its billion plus citizens.

Officer

Members of Parliament
Heena Gavit (BJP)

Guardian Minister

list of Guardian Minister

District Magistrate/Collector

list of District Magistrate / Collector

Divisions
The district comprises six talukas. These talukas are Nandurbar, Navapur, Shahada, Taloda, Akkalkuwa and Akrani Mahal (also called Dhadgaon).

There is one Lok Sabha constituency in the district which is Nandurbar (ST) reserved for Scheduled Tribes. There are four Maharashtra Assembly seats namely Akkalkuwa (ST), Shahada (ST), Nandurbar (ST), Nawapur (ST).

Sakri (ST) and Shirpur (ST) assembly seats from Dhule district are also part of Nandurbar Lok Sabha seat. Nandurbar is primarily a tribal (Adiwasi) district.

History
Nandurbar is a part of Satpuda Pradesh, meaning Seven Hills Region.  The district was part of the  district with Dhule and Jalgaon till July 1998.  The ancient name of this region is Rasika, when Nandurbar was also called Nandanagri after the name of its king Nandaraja.

The district is also rich with mythological accounts of the Ramayana, where the region is referred to as 'Krushik'.
 
The region is linked to various rulers of the time including bhil , Chalukyas, Vartakas and Yadavas.

Prior to Mughal era,  formed the southern boundary of the Tughlaq Empire.

In the Jadavrao Era Yaduvanshi rulers, Nandurbar became Part of West Khandesh in 1400s. 

1400s to 1700s Shinde's became Rao of west Khandesh under Jadhavrao Rulers of Khandesh :-

The Shinde/Scindia (Sarpatils) of Khandesh. Who came from Amirgarh (Present in Rajasthan) as Rao of West Khandesh in and 14th century. In past they are Rai Amirgarh and ancestors of Sindh's Royal Family. They control Khandesh from Laling fort and Dhanur & Dhule Towns. In 1600s Jadhavrao lost ruling power against Mughal but after some time later Rao Shinde recaptured Khandesh with the help of Maratha Empire. In end of 1600s they came under Maratha Empire led by Chhatrapati Sambhaji and after some year later they lost the Administrative and Ruler power against Mughal Empire led by Aurangzeb in war.

Due to its strategic location at the ends of Gujarat and Madhya Pradesh, Nandurbar kept shifting into different power regimes. After the Mughal Empire's decline, the Marathas took control of Khandesh and subsequently on 3 June 1818 the Maratha Peshwa surrendered Khandesh to the British rule.

Nandurbar had its own share in the Indian struggle for independence. It was here that during the Quit India Movement of 1942 Shirish Kumar, a mere boy of 15 years, lost his life by a gun shot. A small memorial has been erected in memory of Shirish Kumar in the square where he shed his blood.

Demographics

 India census, Nandurbar District had a population of 1,309,135, being 50.62% male and 49.38% female. Nandurbar District has an average literacy rate of 46.63%: male literacy is 55.11%, and female literacy is 37.93%.

According to the 2011 census Nandurbar district has a population of 1,648,295, roughly equal to the nation of Guinea-Bissau or the US state of Idaho. This gives it a ranking of 304th in India (out of a total of 640). Its population growth rate over the decade 2001–2011 was 25.5%. Nandurbar has a sex ratio of 972 females for every 1000 males, and a literacy rate of 64.38%. Scheduled Castes and Scheduled Tribes make up 2.91% and 69.28% of the population respectively The Bhils form the major group in the district.

Languages

At the time of the 2011 Census of India, 45.45% of the population in the district spoke Bhili, 16.06% Marathi, 10.46% Khandeshi, 7.34% Pawri, 4.40% Gamit, 3.79% Urdu, 2.61% Kukna and 2.55% Hindi and 2.32% Gujarati as their first language.

Aadivasi (tribal) Languages spoken include Ahirani, Gujar, a Khandeshi tongue with approximately 780,000 speakers, similar to Marathi and Bhili. and Pauri Bareli, a Bhil  and other tribal language with approximately 175 000 speakers, written in the Devanagari script.

Transport and communication
Total railway Lines length :90 km
No of villages connected by road
  12 Months :671
  Temporary :262
Total length of the roads :4338 km
Total length of National Highway :44 km
Total length of State

Education
Nandurbar District has 1354 primary schools with 4497 teachers teaching 1,59,502 students; that comes to 36 students per teacher.
Around 257 secondary schools with 2765 teachers teaching 1,31,554 students, and no of students per teacher comes to 48.
Government Polytechnic Nandurbar with four branches Civil Engineering, Electrical Engineering, Computer Engineering, & Mechanical Engineering with intake capacity of 60 seats each.

Total colleges for higher studies, including medical and engineering, is 30, and more than 8580 students enroll each year.
Nandurbar District also has 6 Government ITI (Industrial Training Institutes) and 2 private ITI having 1444 students in total.
3 VJNT Pri. School [Mhasawad, Akrale & Nandrakhe] 2 high schools, 1 junior college
1 SC Residential School Shahada

Places must see
Chatrapati Shivaji Natya Gruha
At entrance a beautiful statue of Chatrapati Shivaji Maharaj

Toranmal
It is a beautiful hill station which is around 80 km from the Nandurbar city.

Economy
In 2006 the Ministry of Panchayati Raj named Nandurbar one of the country's 250 most backward districts (out of a total of 640). It is one of the twelve districts in Maharashtra currently receiving funds from the Backward Regions Grant Fund Programme (BRGF).

Industries

Total Registered Factories: 346
Total Registered & running Factories: 346
Cooperative Sugar Factories: 3
Total Spinning Mills: 2
Total Cooperative Societies 1400
Primary Agricultural Credit Societies Total: 159
Members: 47448
Cooperative Milk Societies: 392

Notable People 

 Dr. Heena Gavit (Present Member of Parliament from Nandurbar Constituency)
 Vijaykumar Gavit (Member of the Legislative Assembly from Nandurbar Constituency)
 Adv. K. C. Padavi (Member of the Legislative Assembly from Akkalkuwa Constituency)
 Rajesh Padvi (Member of the Legislative Assembly from from Shahada Constituency)
 Shirishkumar Surupsing Naik (Member of the Legislative Assembly from from Navapur Constituency)
 Anil Vasave (First Person from Nandurbar District to climb Mount Kilimanjaro) 
 Manikrao Hodlya Gavit (Former Member of Parliament from Nandurbar Constituency)

Agriculture
Main Crops Jawar, Wheat, Rice, Toor, Groundnuts, Chilly
Annual Crops Sugarcane, Cotton
Area Under Cultivation :2,53,413 Ha
Crop Pattern Kharif (approx. 800 villages), Rabi (approx. 130 villages)
Fruits :Mango, Sitaphal, Banana, Papaya, etc.

Climate

The Climate of Nandurbar District is generally Hot and Dry. As the rest of India Nandurbar District has three distinct seasons; Summer, Monsoon/Rainy and the Winter season.

Summer is from March to mid of June. Summers are usually hot and dry. During the month of May the summer is at its peak. Temperatures can be as high as 45° Celsius during the peak of Summer. The Monsoon sets in during the mid or end of June. During this season the weather is usually humid and hot.  The northern and western regions receive more rainfall than the rest of the region.  The average rainfall is 767 mm through the district. Winter is from the month of November to February. Winters are mildly cold but dry.

Places to see

Prakasha, one of the famous religious places, also known as Dakshin Kashi, is in Shahada Tehsil. The temple of Prakasha is very old.
One of the famous temples of God Shree Ganesha (Heramb) is at Jainagar, 24 km away from Shahada. Hundreds of thousands of people visit this temple on the occasion of Mangli Chathurthi.
Shri Datta temple is at Sarangkheda. Every year a big fair is organised on the eve of Datta Jayanti which has main attraction of sale of horses.
Umaj Mata temple is at Shinda. Every year a big fair is organised on the eve of Ashatami (December).
Hingani is a small village between Shahada and Shirpur. People there conduct the "Mahavakya" & "Mahakavya" of the Mahanubhav panth.
Dandapaneshwar, Devmogra, Nandurbar, Maharashtra
Dev Mogra Mata is mother goddess of Adivasis. Malda-Mogra Tal Taloda is famous village related to Devi Mogra mata.
Saint Gulam Maharaj Ranjanpur Tal Taloda is Saint of adivasi, who took away them from addiction of alcohol.
Ashwasthama Rushi Maharaj, Valiamba, Maharashtra 
Shani Mandir, Shanimandal 
Toranmal 1076 m high peak is famous place for Navnath.

References

External links
 Nandurbar District official website

Aadiwasi Janjagruti

 
Districts of Maharashtra
Nashik division
1998 establishments in Maharashtra